The Nemegt Formation (also known as Nemegtskaya Svita) is a geological formation in the Gobi Desert of Mongolia, dating to the Late Cretaceous. The formation consists of river channel sediments and contains fossils of fish, turtles, crocodilians, and a diverse fauna of dinosaurs, including birds.

Description 
The Nemegt Formation is composed of mudstones and sandstones that were deposited by ancient lakes, streams, and flood plains. The Altan Uul locality was described by Michael Novacek as "a canyon carved out of a very rich series of sedimentary rocks" with "steep cliffs and narrow washes". The climate associated with it was wetter than when preceding formations were deposited; there seems to have existed at least some degree of forest cover. Fossilized trunks have been also found. These petrified wood, and the remains of Araucariaceae conifers indicate that the forests of the Nemegt were thickly wooded, with a high canopy formed by tall conifer trees. When examined, the rock facies of this formation suggest the presence of stream and river channels, mudflats, and shallow lakes. Sediments also indicate that there existed a rich habitat, offering diverse food in abundant amounts that could sustain massive Cretaceous dinosaurs.

Stratigraphy 

The most recent stratigraphy divides the Nemegt Formation into three informal members. The lower member is dominated by fluvial deposits, while middle and upper members consist of alluvial plain, paludal, lacustrine, and fluvial deposits. The colour of the sediments is usually light grey to tan in colour in comparison to the typically red colour of the underlying Barun Goyot Formation. It overlies and sometimes interfingers with the Barun Goyot Formation. Interfingering has been noted at the stratotype (Red Walls) and Hermiin Tsav. There has been no absolute dating of the Nemegt Formation. Historically the Nemegt has been considered late Campanian to Maastrichtian, based on comparisons of fossils present, but no exact dating has been performed. The age for the underlying Baruungoyot Formation (= Svita) has been suggested as Santonian to Campanian, and Shuvalov (2000) found K-Ar dating of basalts that they referred to the mid and upper Baruungoyot to be 75 to 80 million years old.

Paleobiota of the Nemegt Formation
Stratigraphic positions are based on Eberth (2018) who correlated localities to their approximate position within the formation.

Amphibians

Crocodylomorphs

Fish

Flora

Invertebrates

Mammals

Pterosaurs

Turtles

Dinosaurs

Ankylosaurs

Alvarezsaurs

Birds

Dromaeosaurs

Hadrosaurs

Ornithomimosaurs

Oviraptorosaurs

Pachycephalosaurs

Sauropods

A Very large Titanosaur Informally called "Mongolian titan" is present by footprints

Therizinosaurs

Troodontids

Tyrannosaurs

See also 
 Djadochta Formation
 List of dinosaur-bearing rock formations
 List of fossil sites
 Nemegt Basin

References 

 
Geologic formations of Mongolia
Upper Cretaceous Series of Asia
Cretaceous Mongolia
Sandstone formations
Shale formations
Conglomerate formations
Mudstone formations
Lacustrine deposits
Fluvial deposits